Paul Manners (born 27 September 1953) is a British singer, musician, composer and producer best known for being the vocalist of the Italian pop band I Cugini di Campagna from 1978 to 1985. He is the founder and leader of Grammar School, a rock band based in Italy since 1986 and has produced many international stars including, Tina Arena, Sylvie Vartan and Kelly Joyce.

Biography
Born in London, he started learning guitar at the age of 13 and played in various local rock bands. He left school at 19 and decided to tour Europe as a busker. After visiting France, Germany, Belgium, Sweden and Denmark he travelled through Italy, where he decided to settle and where he currently lives. In 1975 he formed a prog rock band called "Aspettando Edmondo" and in 1978 joined a previously famous Italian pop group called I Cugini di Campagna. He recorded 7 successful singles and 3 albums with them, the second of which "Metallo" (:it:Metallo (album)) became the best selling one in the band's history. In 1984 he recorded his first single as a solo artist "Enchanté" published by Baby Records (Italy) with whom he continued to collaborate playing keyboards with the label's internationally successful band Pink Project during their 1985 live tour.

In 1988 he opened his first professional recording studio "Byte Studios" in Riccione where he studied computer programming and sequencing and where he engineered and produced many international dance hits during that period. He participated in Pavarotti & Friends 1995 with a song called "Clap Clap" he had co-written and recorded. In 1997 he built his second studio called "Falcon Valley" in Montefiore Conca where he works today. Here he began producing, publishing and composing for many international artists such as Tina Arena and Sylvie Vartan for whom he was artistic director of the worldwide 2004 tour and producer of the subsequent live CD album and DVD "Palais des Congrès 2004". He has co-written hits for French artists such as Florent Pagny, Elodie Frégé, and Grégory Lemarchal. In 2008 he recorded his first solo album entitled "3/4", a collection of ballads written entirely in 3/4 time and played on classical guitar. Today he continues to tour with the band he founded in 1986 ("Grammar School"), and with his solo act in which he presents the multimedia operas he has created in recent years.

Selected discography

As a singer/musician
Singles with I Cugini di Campagna
 1978 – Dentro l'anima/Halloo cousins. :it:Dentro l'anima... e qualcosa dei giorni passati
 1979 – Solo con te/Mister Paul
 1979 – Meravigliosamente/Festa
 1980 – No tu no/Metallo
 1981 – Valeria/Floridia
 1982 – Uomo mio/Elastico
 1985 – Cucciolo/Volando

Albums with I Cugini di Campagna
 1979 – Meravigliosamente        :it:Meravigliosamente (album)
 1980 – Metallo.    :it:Metallo (album)
 1982 – Gomma.  :it:Gomma (album)

Solo singles	
 1984 – Enchanté
Solo albums
 2008 – 3/4
 2022 – Moon Moods

Albums with Grammar School
 2010 – Grammar School Vol.1
 2015 – Grammar School Volume 2

As producer
 1994 – Epopea,  "People of the night"
 2000 – Kelly Joyce, . :it:Vivre la vie 
 2001 – Tina Arena,  Just Me
 2003 – Tina Arena,  The Peel Me Sessions 2003
 2004 – Tina Arena,  Italian Love Song
 2004 – Sylvie Vartan,  Sylvie
 2004 – Sylvie Vartan,  Palais des Congrès 2004
 2007 – Tina Arena,  Songs of Love & Loss
 2008 – Tina Arena,  Songs of Love & Loss 2
 2014 – Red Canzian,  L'istinto e le stelle

As a songwriter 
 2004 –   Elodie Frégé & Michal.  Viens jusqu'à moi
 2005 –   Florent Pagny.  The day we made God cry
 2005 –   Grégory Lemarchal.  Ecris l'histoire

His multimedia operas
 2010 – A soldier they called Tom  (https://www.youtube.com/watch?v=jbiozeB8p94&t=1s)
 2014 – La lezione italiana  (https://www.youtube.com/watch?v=fPYFvJKNNQs)
 2020 – Il Complesso  (https://www.youtube.com/watch?v=6OWnc3Pqmy8&t=2s)

References

External links
 
 Paul Manners Discography
 Grammar School Discography

1953 births
Living people
British record producers
Singers from London
20th-century British male singers
English emigrants to Italy